is an athlete from Japan, who competes in triathlon. Nakanishi competed at the second Olympic triathlon at the 2004 Summer Olympics.  She took twentieth place with a total time of 2:08:51.06.

External links 
Profile at triathlon.org

1976 births
Living people
Japanese female triathletes
Olympic triathletes of Japan
Triathletes at the 2004 Summer Olympics
Sportspeople from Osaka Prefecture
20th-century Japanese women
21st-century Japanese women